Nagera is a surname. Notable people with the surname include:

 Kenny Nagera (born 2002), French footballer
 María Vallejo-Nágera (born 1964), Spanish novelist

See also
 Nogueira (disambiguation)